The 2007 election of members to the Senate of the Philippines was the 29th election to the Senate of the Philippines. It was held on Monday, May 14, 2007, to elect 12 of the 24 seats in the Senate. Together with those elected in 2004, they will comprise the 14th Congress via plurality-at-large voting. The senators elected in 2004 will serve until June 30, 2010, while the senators elected in this election will serve up to June 30, 2013. The elections to the House of Representatives as well as local elections occurred on the same date. The Philippines uses plurality-at-large voting for seats in the Senate.

In the election, the opposition-backed alliance called the Genuine Opposition (GO) defeated the administration-led alliance TEAM Unity by winning seven of the twelve seats in the Senate. For the first time in Philippine history, Antonio Trillanes was elected as a senator while currently detained for mutiny and rebellion charges. Almost the incumbents running for reelection won except for Ralph Recto who was at fourteenth place.

An electoral protest of GO's Koko Pimentel, the 13th placed candidate, against TEAM Unity's Migz Zubiri, the 12th place candidate, resulted in Zubiri's resignation in the Senate, and the Senate Electoral Tribunal's decision to replace Pimentel with Zubiri. This led to GO winning 7 seats, the biggest win by the opposition in the Senate election history since 1951, notwithstanding 2 other opposition candidates won, and only 2 administration candidates won.

Official candidates 
On March 19, 2007, COMELEC released Resolution No.7832 which finalized and approved the official candidates for the senatorial election.  On March 29, 2007, COMELEC certified 37 Senatorial Candidates.

Background

COMELEC issues

On March 11, 2007, the Old COMELEC Building in Intramuros, Manila was burned by a blazing fire ruining several ballot boxes and pending election protests. The Genuine Opposition considered the fire as political act which ended in burning of several election protests and contested ballot boxes. Investigators found out that instead of arson, it was the generator of the building which caused and since the building was built with tar and wood it would easily razed by fire. The Commission on Elections (COMELEC) faced scrutiny because of the fire that hit its old building on March 11 resulting in speculations of conspiracies to cheat on the May 14 elections. The COMELEC was also lambasted for publishing on the internet the names, addresses and details of registered voters.

The Aquino issue
Three people with the name Aquino filed their candidacies (Benigno Aquino III, Tessie Aquino-Oreta and Theodore Aquino), and there was confusion as to who is credited with a vote if someone wrote only "Aquino" on the ballot. Since Theodore Aquino was disqualified because he had dual citizenship and former Sen. Tessie Aquino-Oreta has the last name Oreta, COMELEC ruled that all votes with only the name Aquino would go to Tarlac Rep. Benigno Aquino III. All three Aquinos are related to each other.

The Cayetano issue
The matter was the same as the Aquino issue. Representative Alan Peter Cayetano (Taguig-Pateros) found out that a certain Joselito Cayetano belonging to the Kilusang Bagong Lipunan (KBL) filed his candidacy with the nickname "Peter" which was really "Jojo". Alan therefore filed a disqualification case (SPA 07-019) against Jojo. Jojo was declared a nuisance candidate by the COMELEC resolution on March 27, 2007.

Jojo then filed for a motion for reconsideration which was eventually rejected on May 11, 2007, but COMELEC did not remove his name from the Official List of Senatorial Candidates and ruled on May 12, 2007, that all votes with only the name "CAYETANO" will be stray votes (discarded) and therefore not counted to either the candidates until Supreme Court resolved the matter. The COMELEC said that Jojo could file a motion for reconsideration at the Supreme Court within five days.

Coalitions and party groupings

TEAM Unity 
TEAM (Together Everyone Achieves More) Unity was the administration-backed coalition composed mostly of supporters and erstwhile critics of then-President Gloria Macapagal Arroyo. TEAM Unity sought to take several Senate seats in order to ensure the passage of President Arroyo's legislative programs and also to protect her from any impeachment attempts by the political opposition after the midterm elections. This coalition is composed by different major political parties including Lakas—Christian Muslim Democrats, Kabalikat ng Malayang Pilipino, Nationalist People's Coalition, Laban ng Demokratikong Pilipino, and Partido Demokratiko Sosyalista ng Pilipinas. The coalition's campaign team was headed by veteran political strategist Reli German as campaign manager, together with Tourism Secretary Ace Durano as spokesperson and Ike Rodriguez as campaign director. TEAM Unity held their proclamation rally at the Cebu Coliseum on February 17, 2007.

Genuine Opposition 
Genuine Opposition (GO) was the main opposition-backed coalition of the parties' senatorial line-up for the elections, which was in opposition to President Arroyo. It was originally called the "United Opposition" (UNO), created by opposition stalwart and Makati Mayor Jejomar Binay in June 2005 to unite all politicians who sought to impeach President Arroyo. UNO then reorganized itself and changed its name to Grand and Broad Coalition (GBC), with the UNO party under that coalition. On February 15, 2007, the group changed its name again to Genuine Opposition after a meeting with Senate President Manny Villar in his office in Las Piñas.

Campaign 
Candidates made use of different campaign platforms to win. Prospero Pichay Jr., Manny Villar, Mike Defensor, and Loren Legarda had been very visible in TV ads. Francis Pangilinan preferred to run as an independent and decided not to participate in sorties and campaign of the Genuine Opposition, even though he was initially drafted as a guest candidate. Teresa Aquino-Oreta had raised different reactions in her TV ad campaign asking the people's forgiveness being the “dancing queen” during the impeachment of deposed President Joseph Estrada. Some candidates like Francis Escudero, Vicente Magsaysay, Francis Pangilinan, Joker Arroyo, Antonio Trillanes and Koko Pimentel made use of the internet by joining networks sites like Friendster; making or updating Wikipedia entries, establishing blogs and websites and airing the commercials on YouTube.

Candidates

Administration coalition

Dominant opposition coalition

Other tickets

KBL

Independent

Independent

Retiring and term-limited incumbents
At this point in time, two senators are voluntarily retiring from the Senate at the end of their current term. As well four senators are term-limited by the Constitution of the Philippines after serving two consecutive terms. There was one vacancy left in the outgoing Senate as Noli de Castro (Independent) was elected as vice-president in 2004.

Franklin Drilon (Liberal): Term-limited in 2007, ran in 2010 and won
Loi Ejercito (PMP): Did not run in 2007, Retiring from politics
Juan Flavier (Lakas): Retiring from politics
Alfredo Lim (PMP): Ran for Mayor of Manila and won
Ramon Magsaysay Jr. (Lakas): Term-limited in 2007, ran in 2013 and lost
Serge Osmeña (PDP–Laban): Term-limited in 2007, campaigned for the Genuine Opposition, ran in 2010 and won

Opinion polls

Opinion polling (locally known as "surveys") is carried out by two major polling firms: Social Weather Stations (SWS), and Pulse Asia, with a handful of minor polling firms. A typical poll asks a voter to name twelve persons one would vote for in the senate election.

Winning candidates

Composition
Candidates who were not make it to the top 12, but were within the margin of error from the 12th-placed candidate, are denoted by figures inside the parenthesis.

Results

The Genuine Opposition (GO) originally won seven seats, TEAM Unity won three seats, a Liberal Party candidate not in any slate won one, and an independent won one.

Five incumbents successfully defended their seats: Edgardo Angara and Joker Arroyo for TEAM Unity, Panfilo Lacson and Manny Villar from GO, and Francis Pangilinan of the Liberal Party.

GO's Benigno Aquino III, Alan Peter Cayetano, Francis Escudero, Antonio Trillanes, and TEAM Unity's Migz Zubiri are the neophyte senators.

Returning are independent candidate Gregorio Honasan, and Loren Legarda from GO.

TEAM Unity's Ralph Recto was the sole incumbent defeated.

Juan Miguel Zubiri's seat would later be awarded to Koko Pimentel of GO in 2011 when the latter won an election protest against the former.

The election of Alfredo Lim as Mayor of Manila in concurrent elections means that his Senate seat will be vacant until June 30, 2010.

Key:
 ‡ Seats up
 + Gained by a party from another party
 √ Held by the incumbent
 * Held by the same party with a new senator
^ Vacancy

Per candidate

Per coalition

Per party
This table depicts the totals after the Senate Electoral Tribunal's 2011 decision on Pimentel v. Zubiri electoral protest.

Unofficial tallies

ABS-CBN/Pulse Asia
Numbers in percentages. Conducted by ABS-CBN and Pulse Asia.

NASSA/NAMFREL quick count
Partial and Unofficial - 197,084 of 224,748 precincts or 87.69% of total precincts. June 2, 2007 11:41 p.m. Batch 43.

Source: NAMFRELPHILIPPINES.org website

Aftermath
Although the Genuine Opposition gained control of the Senate after the elections, they were divided on who was to be next Senate President. As such, Senate President Manuel Villar (Nacionalista) formed a bloc in the Senate to contest the Senate presidency. Facing him was the minority leader Aquilino Pimentel Jr. backed by several fellow opposition senators. On July 26, 2007, Villar defeated Pimentel was elected to Senate by a vote of 15–7 with Villar and Pimentel voting for each other. Senator Antonio Trillanes was not allowed to attend the Senate session.

This is how the election for the Senate presidency went:

Pimentel vs. Zubiri electoral protest

The 12th Senate seat was contested between TEAM Unity's Juan Miguel Zubiri and GO's Koko Pimentel Zubiri was proclaimed In July 2007 with a margin of about 20,000 votes, but Pimentel filed an electoral protest to the Senate Electoral Tribunal (SET), which the tribunal accepted, alleging there was massive electoral fraud in Maguindanao. After the revision of votes on Pimentel's protest in July 2009, he released a statement that he now leads Zubiri by 96,000 votes; Zubiri countered that his counter-protest that alleges similar fraud in Mega Manila has him leading by around 132,000 votes in areas affected by his counter protest.

In July 2011, suspended Autonomous Region in Muslim Mindanao (ARMM) governor Zaldy Ampatuan and Maguindanao election supervisor Lintang Bedol alleged that there was indeed fraud in the ARMM in favor of TEAM Unity. On August 3, 2011, Zubiri resigned, maintaining that he had no hand in alleged electoral fraud in the ARMM. He withdrew his counter-protest, which led to the SET to proclaim Pimentel as the winner on August 11, 2011. Pimentel took his oath at Mati, Davao Oriental, where he had the highest rank among the provinces, finishing in second place.

Pimentel sued former president Gloria Macapagal Arroyo, COMELEC chairman Benjamin Abalos, Maguinadanao elections supervisor Lintang Bedol and others for electoral sabotage on August 17, 2011, at the Department of Justice (DOJ). A joint DOJ-COMELEC panel began investigations on Pimentel's suit by November 3. On November 18, 2011, the commission voted to file charges against Arroyo and others at the Pasay Regional Trial Court, which later ordered Arroyo, Abalos and Bedol arrested later in the day.

References

External links
Official website of the Commission on Elections
Official website of National Movement for Free Elections (NAMFREL)
Official website of the Parish Pastoral Council for Responsible Voting (PPCRV)
VForce - 1 Million Volunteers for Clean Elections (VForce)

Media websites
Halalan 2007 - Election coverage by ABS-CBN
Eleksyon 2007- Election coverage by GMA Network
Eleksyon 2007 - Election coverage by the Philippine Daily Inquirer

2007 Philippine general election
2007